Hedge City is an unincorporated community in Knox County, in the U.S. state of Missouri.

History
Hedge City was platted in 1862. A post office called Hedge City was established in 1876, and remained in operation until 1907.

References

Unincorporated communities in Knox County, Missouri
Unincorporated communities in Missouri